General elections were held in the British Virgin Islands on 25 February 2019. For the first time, four parties with at least one incumbent member were contesting an election.

The result was a decisive victory for the Virgin Islands Party, which won eight of the 13 elected seats. The ruling National Democratic Party won only three seats, with party leader Myron Walwyn losing his seat.  Seven of the thirteen seats were won by candidates contesting an election for the first time, all for the Virgin Islands Party, a territory record.

The elections were the first in the British Virgin Islands to use electronically tabulated voting rather that manual counts. Voter turnout was 64.64%.

Election monitors reported that they saw "no real evidence of corruption", but highlighted a large influx of voter registrations in Districts 5 and 8 which had been regarded in some quarters as potential attempt to manipulate results.

Background
The House of Assembly normally sits in four-year terms.  The Governor must dissolve the House within four years of the date when the House first meets after a general election unless it has been dissolved sooner.  Once the House is dissolved a general election must be held after at least 21 days, but not more than two months after the dissolution of the House.  The third session of the House of Assembly first met on 23 June 2015, and therefore in the ordinary course of things the latest possible date of the next British Virgin Islands general election would have been one day short of four years and two months after that date, i.e. on 22 August 2019.

However, Delores Christopher, member of the House of Assembly representing the 5th District died on 16 October 2018.  There was broad agreement that it was undesirable to hold two elections so close together (a by-election to appoint a new representative for the 5th District, followed by a general election).  Accordingly, after taking legal advice and consulting with the Premier Orlando Smith the Governor, Augustus Jaspert, advised that it had been agreed that no separate by-election should be held, and the election would be held on or before 16 April 2019.

The House of Assembly was dissolved on 23 January 2019 and an election date was immediately announced for 25 February 2019.

Electoral system 
The House of Assembly has a total of 15 members, 13 of whom are members elected by the public to serve a four-year term, plus two ex-officio non-voting members: the Attorney General and the Speaker of the House.  Of the 13 elected members, nine are elected via first-past-the-post voting to represent territorial district seats, and four are elected on a territory-wide "at-large" basis via plurality block voting.

New leaders and new parties
Both of the main political parties which had contested the prior election had leadership contests, and in both cases the person who lost the leadership contest left to form their own party.  Accordingly, in the 2019 election, there were an unprecedented four different political parties with at least one sitting member contesting the general election.

National Democratic Party

In June 2018 the Premier and leader of the National Democratic Party (NDP), Orlando Smith indicated he would be stepping down and not contesting the next general election.  In the subsequent leadership contest the party chose Education Minister Myron Walwyn to lead the party into the next election.

In the wake of Dr Smith's announced retirement, rumours of splits within the ruling National Democratic Party began to circulate almost immediately.  Eventually Ronnie Skelton, runner up in the leadership contest, left to form his own political party, named the Progressive Virgin Islands Movement (PVIM).  

Deputy Premier, Kedrick Pickering, also left the party to run as an independent.

Second District Representative Melvin "Mitch" Turnbull also left the NDP to join Skelton, as did at-large representative, Archie Christian.  Certain media houses began to sarcastically refer to the PVIM as "NDP 2".

Virgin Islands Party

The Virgin Islands Party (VIP) also had a leadership contest, and the sitting leader, Julian Fraser, was ousted by the challenger, Andrew Fahie.  Fraser subsequently announced he would leave the VIP and set up his own party, which he called Progressives United (PU).

Controversies

Myron Walwyn Eligibility Issue

In the run up to the election there were repeated suggestions in the press that Myron Walwyn was not eligible for election to the House of Assembly because his parents are not from the BVI.  His father is from Nevis and his mother is from Antigua.  Leader of the opposition Virgin Islands Party, Andrew Fahie, distanced himself from questions about Walwyn's eligibility.

Speaker of the House Issue
Some controversy arose when leaked lists of candidates suggested that the speaker of the House, Ingrid Moses-Scatliffe, was to stand as an NDP candidate.  A number of public figures, the most prominent being Deputy Premier Kedrick Pickering, expressed concern at her being held out as a candidate for a political party whilst occupying the position of Speaker of the House.  Ms Moses-Scatliffe refused to confirm or deny that she would be a candidate for the NDP, and the Attorney General rendered an opinion indicating that even if she were, this would not legally preclude her from acting as Speaker of the House in the interim.  Ultimately she was not named as a candidate.

Results

Territorial seats
Winning candidates are highlighted in blue.  Previously incumbent candidates are marked in bold.

Incumbent Andrew Fahie (VIP) easily won his sixth consecutive election over his two challengers each contesting their first.  District 1 had the lowest turnout of any district with 60.38% of voters participating.  Fahie's victory was the highest in terms of margin of votes (601) and the percentage of votes cast (81.45%).

Incumbent Melvin Turnbull retained his seat after switching parties to join the PVIM, defeating political newcomer Carnel Clyne (VIP).

Incumbent Julian Fraser won his sixth election but his first as the leader of the PU after leaving the VIP.  He has never lost an election in his 3rd district stronghold.  His opponents, Aaron Parillon (NDP) and Arlene Smith-Thompson (VIP) were each contesting their first election.

Incumbent Mark Vanterpool (NDP) won his fifth election in six contests, narrowly holding off newcomer Luce Hodge-Smith.  District 4 had the highest proportion of spoiled ballots of any district.

Incumbent Delores Christopher died prior to the election leaving the seat vacant.  Newcomer Kye Rymer (VIP) overcame fellow newcomer Wade Smith (PVIM) and political veteran Elvis "Juggy" Harrigan (NDP), who was contesting his fifth election (including once as an at-large candidate).

Incumbent Alvera Maduro-Caines (NDP) won her third consecutive election narrowly defeating newcomer John Samuel (VIP).  Less than a year after the election Maduro-Caines would "cross the floor" to join the VIP.

Incumbent Kedrick Pickering running as an independent in his fifth election, having won his previous four contests, lost to Natalio Wheatley who was contesting his third-ever general election for a third different party.  The same seat was formerly held by Wheatley's grandfather, former Chief Minister, Willard Wheatley.

Marlon Penn (NDP) won his third consecutive contest, comfortably defeating Dean Fahie (VIP) who was standing for election for the first time.

Political newcomer Vincent Wheatley (VIP) easily defeated incumbent Hubert O'Neal (NDP) who was contesting his seventh general election (having won only once previously, in 2015).  District 9 had the highest turnout of any district with 71.03% of voters participating.  Wheatley's 891 votes were the highest total of any district candidate.

At-large seats

The VIP candidates won all four of the at-large seats.  Each of them other than Sharie DeCastro (contesting her second election, after being unsuccessful in 2015), were standing for election for the first time.

Incumbents Myron Walwyn and Ronnie Skelton were not returned (the two other previous incumbents, Orlando Smith and Archie Christian, did not run).

Pre-election polling 

Although no formal or scientific polls were conducted in the Territory, an unofficial online poll was conducted by VI Platinum News which suggested that a majority of voters prefer the Virgin Islands Party, and a plurality of voters prefer Andrew Fahie as leader.  However the highly fragmented outcome of the polling (which does not include independents) pointed to the possibility of a coalition government.

Although unscientific, previous polls have correctly predicted the outcome of past elections.  In this election the final results were also relatively similar to the informal advance polls, each party polling within 2.5% (the normal margin of error on a scientific poll) of the predicted result.

Manifestos 

Myriad political promises were made and publicised by each party. Manifestos for each political party were launched before the election date of 25 February 2019 as follows: 
 The National Democratic Party (NDP) launched their election manifesto Manifesto 2019: Better, Stronger Together on Friday 15 February 2019.
 The Virgin Islands Party (VIP) launched their election manifesto Restoring Hope & Prosperity for All: Virgin Islands Party Manifesto 2019 on Tuesday 19 February 2019.
 The Progressive Virgin Islands Movement (PVIM) launched their Business Plan of the People of the Virgin Islands by Friday 18 January 2019.
 Progressives United (PU) launched Our Vision.
 NDP. Promised to increase scholarships for Virgin Islands to include postgraduate studies, and to make $10 million available to support local businesses.
 PVIM. Promised to cut tax by increasing the tax free allowance on payroll taxes from $10,000 to $15,000 and promised to introduce a bonus scheme for public sector employees.  They also suggested legalising gambling.
 PU. Promised free legal services, elderly healthcare and free school lunches, as well as pledging to give $1,000,000 a year to research into chronic diseases.  Also pledged to introduce "American black history" into school curriculum.
 VIP.  Promised to introduce 'district councils', reduce the need for imported labour and introduce whistleblower laws.  They also advocated laws mandating the purchase of local foods before importing food from overseas, and providing subsidies for farmers.

Government 

As the leader of the party with a majority, Andrew Fahie was appointed Premier and invited to form a government.

In appointing his Cabinet, Fahie reshuffled various ministerial portfolios from the traditional division of responsibilities.  Unusually, every member of Cabinet except for Fahie himself is a political newcomer entering the House of Assembly for the first time.

In addition, Shereen Flax-Charles was appointed a junior minister for tourism.

Subsequent events 

Following the shock defeat of Myron Walwyn, Marlon Penn was appointed Leader of the Opposition.  After initially prevaricating, Walwyn confirmed that he would not be quitting politics.

As is customary, the opposition pledged to work with the new government.

Eight days after the election, the successful District 4 candidate and former Cabinet Minister, Mark Vanterpool shocked the country by announcing he was resigning from politics and stepping down from his seat.  He subsequently withdrew his resignation and alleged it was invalid as it was sent to the Cabinet Secretary and not the Speaker of the House as required by the Constitution.  The Speaker has insisted that the seat is vacant, but in subsequent legal proceedings the court eventually ruled in favour of Mr Vanterpool.

References

British Virgin Islands
British Virgin Islands
General election
Elections in the British Virgin Islands
February 2019 events in North America